Félix Mantilla was the defending champion but lost in the second round against Nicolás Lapentti. In the first round, wildcard entrant Sergi Bruguera defeated Roger Federer 6–1, 6–1. This is Federer's worst loss by number of games won in his entire career.

Seeds
A champion seed is indicated in bold text while text in italics indicates the round in which that seed was eliminated. The top eight seeds received a bye to the second round.

Draw

Finals

Top half

Section 1

Section 2

Bottom half

Section 3

Section 4

References

2000 Torneo Godó
Singles